Justice Kamajit Singh Garewal is an Indian Judge. He was a sitting United Nations Appeals Tribunal and Punjab and Haryana High Court judge.

Biography

He did his schooling from  Mayo College, Ajmer and later graduated from St. Stephen's College, Delhi. He was appointed as a judge at Punjab and Haryana High Court on 23 May 2000.

He was elected by the UN General Assembly as Judge of the United Nations Appeals Tribunal (UNAT) on 2 March 2009 obtaining 154 votes out of 172 cast which is the highest number for any candidate. Justice Garewal had served in the UNAT for a three-year term, starting from 1 July 2009.

References

Year of birth missing (living people)
Living people
Indian judges of United Nations courts and tribunals